The Dark is a 2018 Austrian horror film written and directed by Justin P. Lange and starring  Nadia Alexander, Toby Nichols, and Karl Markovics. The plot features an undead teenage girl befriending an abused, blind boy and regaining humanity in the process. The film debuted at the 2018 Tribeca Film Festival and was released in the US on October 26, 2018.

Cast
 Nadia Alexander as Mina
 Toby Nichols as Alex
 Karl Markovics as Josef

Reception
Variety described The Dark as "well-crafted and well-acted", but that "in trying to succeed as something both metaphorical and very literal-minded, the movie ends up being neither one nor the other — not psychologically deep enough to succeed as pure drama, and too earnest to offer the usual rewards of a genre film."

References

External links
 
 

2018 horror films
Films about child abuse
Films about murderers
Austrian zombie films
2010s English-language films